The Trichomycterinae are a subfamily of catfishes (order Siluriformes) of the family Trichomycteridae. It includes six genera, Bullockia, Hatcheria, Rhizosomichthys, and Eremophilus, all monotypic, Silvinichthys with two species, and Trichomycterus, with over 100 species. The former five genera are diagnosed by putatively apomorphic characters, whereas Trichomycterus is defined by the lack of those specializations and is likely not monophyletic. This subfamily has historically served as much of a wastebasket for trichomycterids that lack the specializations of the other subfamilies.
Species of Trichomycterinae dwell in headwaters and small, cold clear water streams running over stony beds. Due to the patchy distribution of their habitats, trichomycterines generally have restricted geographic distributions, thus display a high level of endemism.

References

Trichomycteridae
Fish of South America
Ray-finned fish subfamilies